Temptation Chiwunga (born 10 March 1992) is a Zimbabwean professional footballer who plays as a forward for South Africa's National First Division club, JDR Stars FC, and the Zimbabwe national team.

Born in Zimbabwe, Chiwunga's family moved to South Africa in 2010, and he begain playing club football with JDR Stars. He captained Ubuntu Cape Town before returning to captain JDR Stars in 2020.

References 

1992 births
Living people
Zimbabwean footballers
Zimbabwe international footballers
Ethiopian Premier League players
JDR Stars F.C. players
2021 Africa Cup of Nations players